Manoel Miluir Macedo Cunha (born 15 April 1948 in Pedro Avelino) is a Brazilian professional football manager.

Career
Since June 1997 until March 1999 he coached the Andorra national football team. In 2013, he was a head coach of the ACD Potiguar de Mossoró.

References

External links
Profile at Soccerway.com
Profile at Soccerpunter.com

1948 births
Living people
Brazilian football managers
Expatriate football managers in Andorra
Andorra national football team managers
Sportspeople from Rio Grande do Norte
Brazilian expatriate football managers
Brazilian expatriate sportspeople in Andorra
Brasília Futebol Clube managers
Juan Aurich managers